Normal People is an Irish romantic psychological drama limited series produced by Element Pictures for BBC Three and Hulu in association with Screen Ireland. It is based on the 2018 novel of the same name by Sally Rooney. The series follows the relationship between Marianne Sheridan (Daisy Edgar-Jones) and Connell Waldron (Paul Mescal), as they navigate adulthood from their final days in secondary school to their undergraduate years in Trinity College. The series was primarily written by Rooney and Alice Birch and directed by Lenny Abrahamson and Hettie Macdonald.

The series was released on BBC Three in the United Kingdom on 26 April 2020, followed by weekly airings on BBC One. It premiered on RTÉ One in Ireland on 28 April 2020. In the United States, the series was released in its entirety on Hulu on 29 April 2020. The series has received critical acclaim, with praise for the performances, directing, writing, aesthetics, and its portrayal of mature content. At the 72nd Primetime Emmy Awards, the series was nominated for four awards, including Outstanding Lead Actor for Mescal and Outstanding Directing for Abrahamson.

Premise
The series follows Marianne Sheridan and Connell Waldron through their time at secondary school in County Sligo on Ireland's Atlantic coast, and later as undergraduate students at Trinity College Dublin.

The focus is mainly Connell's and Marianne's complex relationship. Among her peers at secondary school, Marianne is regarded as an oddball, but she denies caring about her social standing.

Despite her academic achievements, her home life is complicated by her dismissive mother, Denise, and her resentful brother, Alan. Her father is deceased and is later revealed to have been domestically abusive, though her family avoids mentioning him.

Connell is an athletic, high-achieving student living with his single mother Lorraine, who is employed by Denise as a house cleaner. He is popular in school, though he remains silent while Marianne is constantly bullied. This creates complexity and point of contention as their relationship develops.
In addition to that, both characters struggle to articulate their feelings and misread each other's intentions.

Cast

Main
 Daisy Edgar-Jones as Marianne Sheridan, a student from an affluent family who is studious, outspoken, and therefore disliked. She begins a relationship with Connell which she initially suggests they keep secret. She later attends Trinity College Dublin and studies history and politics. Marianne struggles with validation from her family and romantic relationships which have an impact on the way she views herself.
 Paul Mescal as Connell Waldron, a well-liked, academically gifted student and athlete. His mother works as a cleaner for Marianne's family. He struggles with what he wants out of life and decides to follow Marianne's suggestion and apply to be an undergraduate at Trinity College to study English.

Recurring
 Sarah Greene as Lorraine Waldron, Connell's single mother who is employed as the Sheridans' cleaner. She and Connell share a close relationship and she expresses disappointment when Connell chooses his public image over treating Marianne well when they are in school. Prior to Marianne and Connell's secret relationship, she is very close with Marianne.
 Aislín McGuckin as Denise Sheridan, Marianne's single, wealthy mother who is a solicitor. Marianne's father is described as being abusive towards her. She doesn't have a close relationship with Marianne and often fails to control Alan's abuse towards Marianne throughout the series.
 Éanna Hardwicke as Rob Hegarty, a close friend and schoolmate of Connell.
 Frank Blake as Alan Sheridan, Marianne's brother who mistreats Marianne her verbally and physically.
 Eliot Salt as Joanna, a close friend Marianne meets at Trinity College. 
 India Mullen as Peggy, a friend of Marianne at college who also comes from a wealthy background.
 Desmond Eastwood as Niall, Connell's flatmate at college. He and Marianne become friends and he often encourages Connell and Marianne's relationship.
 Sebastian de Souza as Gareth, Connell college classmate, an advocate of free speech and Marianne's early collegiate love interest.
 Fionn O'Shea as Jamie, part of Marianne's social circle at Trinity College who is very competitive. He has a crush on Marianne throughout their university days.
 Leah McNamara as Rachel Moran, a fellow schoolmate of Marianne and Connell's and part of Connell's social circle. She and Connell once had a casual fling, making her occasionally jealous of Marianne. Connell asks her to the Debs formal instead of Marianne.
 Seán Doyle as Eric, one of Connell's school friends.
 Niamh Lynch as Karen, one of the nicer girls to Marianne at school in Sligo.
 Kwaku Fortune as Philip, a friend of Marianne's at college. 
 Clinton Liberty as Kiernan.
 Aoife Hinds as Helen Brophy, Connell's girlfriend at college.
 Lancelot Ncube as Lukas, Marianne's boyfriend in Sweden.
 Noma Dumezweni as Gillian, Connell's therapist.

Episodes

Production

Development and casting
In May 2019, it was announced that BBC Three and Hulu ordered 12 episodes based on the novel that would premiere 2020 starring Daisy Edgar-Jones and Paul Mescal as Marianne and Connell, respectively. Sarah Greene and Aislín McGuckin were also announced as part of the cast. Sally Rooney herself would help with the adaptation alongside writers Alice Birch and Mark O'Rowe. Lenny Abrahamson and Hettie Macdonald would direct and the Irish company Element Pictures would produce the series.

Filming

Principal photography began on location in County Sligo and Dublin in May 2019.

Tubbercurry primarily made up the fictional town of Carricklea, with Streedagh Point along Ireland's Wild Atlantic Way used for beach scenes, Knockmore House in Enniskerry, County Wicklow for the Sheridans' residence, a terraced home in Shankill, Dublin for the Waldrons' residence, and Hartstown Community School in Clonsilla, Fingal, County Dublin for the secondary school scenes featuring real-life students in the background. Students from Trinity College Dublin were also featured in the series while filming at the university. Scenes at Marianne's Dublin flat were shot on Wellington Road in the affluent area of Ballsbridge.

Although set in Trieste in the novel, filming took place in Central Italy, primarily in and around Sant'Oreste, Stimigliano, and the villa Il Casale on Tenuta di Verzano, in Lazio. They waited until February 2020 to film the Sweden scenes in Luleå so snow would be on the ground and the Baltic Sea frozen over for Marianne to walk on.

Music

 Episode 1 ends with the song "Warped Windows" by Anna Mieke.
 Episode 2 opens with the song "Did It To Myself" by Orla Gartland and ends with the song "Angeles" by Elliott Smith.
 Episode 3 ends with the song "Only You" by Alison Moyet.
 Episode 4 ends with the song "Undertow" by Lisa Hannigan.
 Episode 5 ends with the song "Make You Feel My Love" covered by Ane Brun.
 Episode 6 opens with the song "Too Much" by Carly Rae Jepsen.
 Episode 7 ends with the song "Metrona" by The Sei.
 Episode 8 ends with the song "Love Will Tear Us Apart" covered by Nerina Pallot.
 Episode-9 opens with the song "Rare" by Selena Gomez.
 Episode 10 ends with the song "Everything I Am Is Yours" by Villagers.
 Episode 11 ends with the song "Strange Weather" by Anna Calvi featuring David Byrne.
 The series also featured music from The Young Will Eat The Old, the debut album from Irish hip hop duo Tebi Rex.

Release
The first look pictures came out on 1 November 2019. BBC Three and Hulu released their own teasers on 17 January 2020, followed by trailers on 31 March 2020.

The 12 episodes became available as a BBC Three box set on BBC iPlayer on 26 April, followed by a BBC One airing on 27 April. The series became available on Stan in Australia on 27 April and began airing on RTÉ One in Ireland on 28 April. The series premiered in the US on Hulu on 29 April. The series has been sold to over 20 broadcasters worldwide.

In June 2020, Abrahamson directed Edgar-Jones and Mescal in a one-off spoof short episode as part of RTÉ Does Comic Relief, in which Marianne and Connell give confessions to a priest played by Andrew Scott.

Reception

Critical response
The series has received critical acclaim. On Rotten Tomatoes, the series has a 91% "Certified Fresh" rating, with an average score of 8.15/10 based on 85 reviews. The site's critic consensus states, "Anchored by Daisy Edgar-Jones and Paul Mescal's vulnerable performances, Normal People is at once intimate and illuminating, beautifully translating the nuances of its source material." On Metacritic the series has a score of 82 out of 100 based on reviews from 25 critics, indicating "universal acclaim".

Caroline Framke of Variety magazine wrote: "With its trifecta of elegant writing, directing, and acting, Hulu's Normal People is just as bleak and uncompromising as Rooney's novel—a feat, and one that takes several episodes to fully absorb. In fact, it took me until about halfway through to understand just how much it was affecting me. ... As Marianne and Connell's relationship grows deeper, Normal People becomes as immersive as the book that inspired it, making you both crave and dread knowing—or perhaps more accurately, experiencing—what happens next."

The production has received particular praise for its realistic portrayal of intimate content and the work of Ita O'Brien as the show's intimacy coordinator. The nudity sparked debate on Irish radio, with callers to Joe Duffy's Liveline saying it was inappropriate.

The series has been widely praised by major critics and publications. Linda Holmes of NPR described Normal People as "a lovely series, not just to binge, but perhaps to dole out to yourself a couple of episodes at a time" while CNN described it as "perfectly [understanding of] the desires we place on communication technologies and the ways they nearly always come up short" and "irresistible in abnormal times".

Prathyush Parasuraman of Film Companion, wrote, "Rarely have I seen the sort of cultural dialogue that I saw post the release of Normal People in April 2020, when it was released in the UK. Based on Sally Rooney's namesake book, the story follows Marianne and Connell through the later years of their high-school, their years at college, and the post-collegiate restlessness, failing to be what one wished for oneself only years ago. It's set in and around Ireland, with brief detours to sunny Italy and snowy Sweden."

The Irish Independent noted that the series glosses over references to The Communist Manifesto and Doris Lessing's feminist novel The Golden Notebook, which Rooney, who has described herself as a Marxist, included in the book.

Viewing figures
Normal People reportedly gave BBC Three its best ever week on iPlayer (26 April to 3 May), receiving over 16.2 million programme requests across the 12 episodes, about 5 million of which were from 16- to 34-year-olds, and bringing BBC Three requests up to 21.8 million, doubling the previous record of 10.8 million from the release of the first series of Killing Eve. Seventy per cent of BBC Three requests that week were for Normal People and a quarter had finished all 12 episodes. It became the most-streamed series of the year on the BBC, with 62.7 million views from April to November 2020.

The first two episodes were reported to have been watched on RTÉ One by an average of 371,000 viewers with an additional 19,000 on RTÉ One +1 and 301,000 streams on RTÉ Player, becoming the most watched opening of a drama series on RTÉ Player. Thirty per cent of 15- to 34-year-olds watching TV were watching Normal People. The finale had over 319,000 viewers, 33% of the total RTÉ audience and 20% increase over the previous week.

In June 2020, it was reported that Normal People had garnered over 3 million views on RTÉ Player, breaking the previous record for the streaming service of 1.2 million, which was held by the fourth series of Love/Hate.

Awards and nominations

References

External links 
 
 

2020 British television series debuts
2020 British television series endings
2020s British drama television series
2020s British romance television series
2020s British television miniseries
2020s college television series
2020 Irish television series debuts
2020 Irish television series endings
2020s Irish television series
BBC romance television shows
BBC television dramas
County Sligo in fiction
English-language television shows
Hulu original programming
Television shows based on Irish novels
Television shows filmed in the Republic of Ireland
Television shows set in the Republic of Ireland
Television shows set in Italy
Television shows set in Sweden
Television series by BBC Studios